Michael Steele (1958) is a United States politician and former Lieutenant Governor of Maryland.

Michael Steele may also refer to:

Michael Steele (Canadian politician) (1861–1946), politician in Ontario, Canada
Michael Steele (musician) (born 1955), bassist, songwriter, and singer, performed with The Runaways and The Bangles
Michael D. Steele, U.S. Army colonel
J. Michael Steele, professor of statistics at the University of Pennsylvania
Mike Steele (Washington politician), American politician (1982)
Iron Mike Steele, professional wrestler

See also
Michael Steel (disambiguation)